The 1945–46 Italian Football Championship, officially known as 1945–46 Divisione Nazionale, was the first tournament held after World War II. Wartime disruptions and US occupation of Northern Italy forced to divide the Serie A championship in two sections, North and South. Some of the Southern sides that took part to the competition were the Serie B teams. The title was won by Torino after a final national round.

Northern Italy Serie A Championship
Campionato Alta Italia Serie A

Just after the Allied disbandment of the fascist Higher Directory, the major clubs from US-occupied Northern Italy replaced it by a provisional football league, the High Italy League (Lega Alta Italia), which organized the local section of the Serie A.

Teams
Modena and Brescia had been promoted from Serie B.

Sampierdarenese and Andrea Doria reborn from Liguria and both joined this championship as FIGC special guests to repair their forced fusion by the fascist government in 1927.

Classification

Tie-breaker
Played in Bologna on April 21.

Repetition
Played in Modena on April 24.

Results

Central and Southern Italy Serie A-B Championship

Campionato Centro-Sud Serie A-B

Teams
Bari had been relegated to Serie B but the FIGC annulled the move for wartime reasons.

Serie B guests
Palermo had been relegated to Serie C but the FIGC annulled the move for wartime reasons.

Salernitana had been promoted from Serie C.

Pisa was granted of a special break for its huge wartime damages. MATER had been disbanded.

Classification

Results

Final round

Classification

Results

Top goalscorers

References and sources
Almanacco Illustrato del Calcio - La Storia 1898-2004, Panini Edizioni, Modena, September 2005

External links
  - All results on RSSSF Website.

1945-46
Italy
1